Euphorbia subpeltata is a species of plant in the family Euphorbiaceae. It is endemic to Mexico.

References

subpeltata
Flora of Mexico